Qingyang Subdistrict is a subdistrict in Jinjiang, Quanzhou, Fujian Province, People's Republic of China.

Subdivision of Qingyang 
, Qingyang Subdistrict has 13 communities: Qingxin Community, Jinqing Community, Qinghua Community, Lianyu Community, Chencun Community 
(), Xiahang Community, Zengjing Community, Gaoxia Community, Puzhao Community, Hongzhai'an Community, Xiangshan Community, Yangguang Community, and Yongfuli Community.

Religious buildings 
Qingyang Stonedrum Temple at Shigu Temple

See also 
 List of township-level divisions of Fujian

References

Township-level divisions of Fujian
Jinjiang, Fujian